Pila Fifita (born 13 June 1975 in Viliame Fifita) is a rugby union player who has represented Tonga, including one cap during the 2003 Rugby World Cup. He also played two seasons for the New Zealand Divisional 15. He plays as a winger.

North Otago
Pila Fifita debuted for North Otago in 2000. He along with most of his teammates suffered losses in his first two seasons the worst being in 2001 in the NPC final, but he enjoyed success in 2002 when he was a main part of the NPC 3rd Division winning team. 2002 was a great year for fifita, scoring a convincing 15 tries for the season including three hat-tricks, the best coming in the final against Horowhenua-Kapita making him the first person out of any of the NPC divisions to score three tries in a NPC final. He ended up scoring 79 points for the season. Fifita played many matches for North Otago the last coming at the end of the 2005 season, he was a stand out player in the union and he was arguerably one of North Otago's greatest and most valuarable players.

Saracens
After playing for North Otago Fifita signed a deal with European club Saracens in 2004. The Saracens head coach Rod Kafer said "We have been looking to get the correct balance and variety in our back line and we feel Pila will provide that.
He's a very powerful player who can break the gain line and carry the ball in an uncompromising way. We've cast the net far and wide in order to get the balance in our squad." So Fifita joined his new side after his last season for North Otago.

Fukuoka Sanix Blues
After playing a couple of seasons in Europe for Saracens he went to play for the Japanese club Fukuoka Sanix Blues in the Top League. He is currently still playing for the Fukuoka Sanix Blues.

Tonga
In 2003 after playing impressive matches for North Otago in 2002 and 2003, Pila Fifita was called into the Tongan rugby world cup squad to replace Aisea Havili after he withdrew because of a leg injury. North Otago chief executive Ian Patterson said Fifita's selection was exciting for the province. "We're absolutely thrilled for Pila. He's had a very strong couple of seasons and it's great for him to get this reward.
"He's a major part of our team and we will miss him". Fifita got to play one match in the 2003 rugby world cup on October 29 against Canada. In 2005 Fifita was again called into the Tongan rugby team but like in 2003 he only played one match.

Griffith Uni Colleges Knights
As of January 2018 Fifita is currently a member of the Griffith Uni Colleges Knights in the Gold Coast District Rugby Union Competition on the Gold Coast, QLD, Australia.

Notes

Living people
1975 births
Tonga international rugby union players
North Otago rugby union players
Tongan rugby union players
Tongan expatriate rugby union players
Expatriate rugby union players in France
Expatriate rugby union players in Japan
Expatriate rugby union players in New Zealand
Tongan expatriate sportspeople in France
Tongan expatriate sportspeople in Japan
Tongan expatriate sportspeople in New Zealand
Rugby union wings